The Wales Empire Pool, known locally as the Empire Pool, was an international standard swimming pool building, located in Cardiff, Wales from 1958 until it was demolished in 1998. It was a centrepiece for the 1958 British Empire and Commonwealth Games.

Background

A site on Wood Street in the centre of the Cardiff had been identified in the 1930s as a good location for a new swimming baths. However, the construction of a new pool was not realised until Cardiff was chosen as the hosts of the 1958 British Empire and Commonwealth Games. The pool's site was immediately next to the Cardiff Arms Park, which was the main stadium for the Games.

The building was acclaimed as the first example of modernist architecture in Cardiff, and was similar in design to the Royal Festival Hall in London. It was designed by D. M. Davies, believed to be influenced by Peter Behrens' 1910 AEG turbine factory. The Royal Institute of British Architects differs in opinion, attributing the design to John Dryburgh, the City Architect 1957–74. The structural engineer was Oscar Faber, who was known for his work with reinforced concrete.

Work on the new pool began in January 1956 and the completed building was opened by the Lord Mayor of Cardiff, J. H. Morgan, on 18 April 1958, two months before the Empire Games started. The City Council were initially reluctant to finance the new pool, but agreed to do so when confronted with the ultimatum of "No Pool – No Games". The total cost of construction was £650,000 and the 1958 Empire Games went on to achieve a financial surplus of £37,000.

Facilities
For spectators there were 1,722 permanent seats. In addition to the main pool, there was an aerotone therapeutic bath, Turkish baths, physiotherapy rooms, hot showers, a restaurant and a large reception area.

In 1970 the main pool was shortened to 50 metres, meeting new international standards.

In 1973 a teaching pool was created for school children, opened by Winifred Mathias, Lord Mayor of Cardiff.

Demolition

The Empire Pool was demolished in 1998 to make space for the Millennium Stadium, leading to a severe lack of swimming facilities in the South Wales area. In 2003 a new Wales National Pool was opened in Swansea  while Cardiff received the £32 million Cardiff International Pool, which opened in Cardiff Bay in February 2008.

See also

List of Commonwealth Games venues

References

External links
Media at People's Collection Wales

Sports venues in Cardiff
Swimming venues in Wales
Sports venues completed in 1958
Sports venues demolished in 1998
Demolished buildings and structures in Wales
Demolished sports venues in the United Kingdom
Defunct sports venues in Wales
Commonwealth Games swimming venues